The black-and-white tody-flycatcher (Poecilotriccus capitalis) is a species of bird in the family Tyrannidae. It was formerly placed in the genus Todirostrum, and known as the black-and-white tody-tyrant. It is found in thickets, especially bamboo, in southern Colombia, eastern Ecuador, eastern Peru, and south-western Brazil.

References

Poecilotriccus
Birds of the Amazon Basin
Birds of Colombia
Birds of Ecuador
Birds of Peru
Birds described in 1857
Taxa named by Philip Sclater
Taxonomy articles created by Polbot